Paula Andújar Jiménez (born 22 July 1993) is a Spanish footballer who plays as a defender for Granada CF Femenino.

Club career
Andújar started her career at Torrejón B.

References

External links
Profile at La Liga

1993 births
Living people
Women's association football defenders
Spanish women's footballers
Footballers from Madrid
AD Torrejón CF Femenino players
Rayo Vallecano Femenino players
Primera División (women) players
Spanish expatriate women's footballers
Expatriate women's soccer players in the United States
Primera Federación (women) players
EdF Logroño players